Balurghat Airport  is located  from Balurghat and  away from Gangarampur, a city in West Bengal, India. The airport is currently not in operation.

History
During the World War II, a temporary airport was built by the British in Balurghat for military needs. In the 1950's, the Surekha Air Service started flying from there until it was stopped during the India-Pakistan war. Finally, in 1984, Vayudoot operated out of the airport. But these flights stopped due to lack of navigation systems, lack of passengers, and financial losses.

Facilities

Extension 
The Government of West Bengal had planned to launch air services from the Balurghat Airport in March 2018. The government had allocated around ₹11.35 crores for the up-gradation & extension of the air-strip, passenger lounge, air traffic, restroom of crews and pilots, need-based restaurants, refreshment counters. Airport Authority of India had visited the airport for approvals.

See also
 List of airports by ICAO code: V#VA VE VI VO - India
 List of airports in India

References

External links

Airports in West Bengal
Balurghat
Year of establishment missing